"Sun and Moon" is a 1920 short story by Katherine Mansfield. It was first published in the Athenaeum on 1 October 1920, and later reprinted in Bliss and Other Stories.

Plot summary
The children, Sun and Moon, are hanging around the house while a party is being prepared. They play games, then are sent off to bed. The party wakes them up; their parents find them out of their beds and instead of scolding them, they let them go downstairs for a bite - but Sun starts sobbing because Moon has eaten the nut from the centerpiece (the moment of ruined perfection, a recurring theme in Mansfield's work), and they are sent off to bed again.

Characters
Sun (a boy) 
Moon (a girl) 
Nurse
Annie
Mother
Father
the pianist
Minnie, the new cook.
Nellie, the housemaid.

Major themes
 The gap between children and adults

Literary significance
The text is written in the modernist mode, without a set structure, and with many shifts in the narrative.

Footnotes

External links
Full text

Modernist short stories
1920 short stories
Short stories by Katherine Mansfield
Works originally published in Athenaeum (British magazine)